Komárov is name of several locations:

Czech Republic
Komárov (Beroun District), a market town in the Central Bohemian Region
Komárov (Olomouc District), a village and municipality in the Olomouc Region
Komárov (Tábor District), a village and municipality in the South Bohemian Region
Komárov (Zlín District), a village and municipality in the Zlín Region
Komárov, a village and administrative part of Dolní Roveň in the Pardubice Region
Komárov, a village and administrative part of Kladruby nad Labem in the Pardubice Region
Komárov, a district in the Brno-jih borough of the city Brno in the South Moravian Region

Slovakia
Komárov, Bardejov District, a municipality and village in the Prešov Region
Komárov, a former village, which became part of Podunajské Biskupice (now a city part of Bratislava) in 1944